Motatau or Mōtatau is a locality in the Northland Region of the North Island of New Zealand. Maromaku is to the east. The Taikirau Stream flows from east through Motatau and then runs northwest to join the Waiharakeke Stream. The North Auckland Line runs through Motatau.

The name is Māori for "to speak to oneself".

Motatau has two marae. Mōtatau Marae and Manu Koroki are a meeting place for the Ngāpuhi hapū of Ngāti Hine and Ngāti Te Tāwera. Matawaia Marae and Rangimarie meeting house is a meeting place of the Ngāpuhi hapū of Ngāti Hine, Ngāti Ngāherehere and Te Kau i Mua.

Demographics
The SA1 area is part of the larger Maromaku statistical area.

The SA1 statistical area had a population of 249 at the 2018 New Zealand census, an increase of 33 people (15.3%) since the 2013 census, and an increase of 15 people (6.4%) since the 2006 census. There were 72 households, comprising 114 males and 135 females, giving a sex ratio of 0.84 males per female. The median age was 38.2 years (compared with 37.4 years nationally), with 75 people (30.1%) aged under 15 years, 36 (14.5%) aged 15 to 29, 105 (42.2%) aged 30 to 64, and 30 (12.0%) aged 65 or older.

Ethnicities were 56.6% European/Pākehā, 67.5% Māori, 7.2% Pacific peoples, 1.2% Asian, and 6.0% other ethnicities. People may identify with more than one ethnicity.

Although some people chose not to answer the census's question about religious affiliation, 33.7% had no religion, 51.8% were Christian, 4.8% had Māori religious beliefs, 1.2% were Buddhist and 3.6% had other religions.

Of those at least 15 years old, 18 (10.3%) people had a bachelor's or higher degree, and 45 (25.9%) people had no formal qualifications. The median income was $28,100, compared with $31,800 nationally. 18 people (10.3%) earned over $70,000 compared to 17.2% nationally. The employment status of those at least 15 was that 102 (58.6%) people were employed full-time, 15 (8.6%) were part-time, and 6 (3.4%) were unemployed.

Education
Motatau School is a decile 3 coeducational primary school serving years 1–8. It has a roll of  students as of  The school opened in 1914.

References

Far North District
Populated places in the Northland Region